This list of schools in the African country of Zimbabwe includes the country's primary and secondary schools.  Zimbabwe's tertiary schools are listed on a separate sub-list at List of universities in Zimbabwe.

Schools 'highfied' are listed alphabetically by Zimbabwean province and then by Zimbabwean district and then by further subdivision (i.e., city or town).

(Many schools were given politically motivated new names in 2002. These are noted after the old name.)

Matebeleland North School

Fatima High School 
Marist Brothers Secondary 
Hwange Government School 
Nechilibi Secondary School 
Detema Secondary School 
Mosi-Oa-Tunya High School

Bulawayo Province 

 Christian Brothers College, Bulawayo
 Bulawayo Technical School, Bulawayo
 Coghlan Primary School, Bulawayo
 Dominican Convent High School, Bulawayo
 Falcon College
 Founders High School, Bulawayo
 Gifford High School, Bulawayo
 Girls' College, Bulawayo
 Hamilton High School
 Ihlati Secondary School
 Milton High School 
 Mpopoma High School
 Mzilikazi High School
 Petra High School
 Rhodes Estate Preparatory School
 Sizane Secondary School
 Whitestone School
 Townsend High School
 Masiyephambili Junior School

 Magwegwe High School
 Pumula High School
 Masotsha High School

Harare Province 

 Allan Wilson High School
 Arundel School
 Bishopslea Preparatory School
 Chisipite Junior School
 Chisipite Senior School
 Churchill School
 Cornway College
 Cranborne Boys High School
 Dominican Convent High School
 Eaglesvale High School
 Ellis Robins School
 Emerald Hill School – school for the deaf
 Gateway High School
 Girls High School
 Glen View 4 primary school
 Harare High School
 Harare International School
 Hartmann House Preparatory School
 Hatfield Junior School
 Hallingbury Junior School
 Hellenic Academy
 The Heritage School
 Highfield High School
 Highfield Secondary School
 Highlands Infant School
 Highlands Junior School
 Hilbright Science College
 His Mercy Christian College
 Kambuzuma High 1 School
 Kuwadzana 1 High School
 Kuwadzana 2 High School
 Kwayedza High School
 Lord Malvern School
 Lewisam Primary School
 Mabelreign Girls High School
 Mabvuku High School
 Maranatha Christian High School
 Maranatha Junior School
 Marlborough High School
 Mazowe Boys High School
 Morgan High School
 Mount Pleasant School – now Joshua Nkomo High School
 Mufakose Number 2 High School
 Oriel High School
 Prince Edward School
 Queen Elizabeth Girls School – now Sally Mugabe Girls' High
 Roosevelt Girls High
 Reekworth Junior School
 St. Christopher's School
 St Dominic's Chishawasha
 St. George's College
 St. John's College
 St. John's High School
 St. Marcellin Primary School (Hatfield, Harare)
 Sharon School
 Speciss College
 Sunny Day Christian Primary School
 Tynwald High School
 Umaa Institute Harare
 Umaa Elite College
 Vainona High School
 Westridge High School
 Zengeza High School
 ZRP High School

 Holy Trinity College, Catholic University of Zimbabwe
 Elite Children's Heritage

Manicaland Province 

 St Dominic's High School
 Chancellor Junior School
 Chitakatira High School
 Hillcrest College
 Hillcrest Preparatory School
 Hope Alive Junior School
 Knowstics Girls College
 Knowstics Boys College
 Mutanda Primary School
 Sakubva High School
 Nyanga High School, Marist Brothers
 St Faith's School, Rusape
 Mount Selinda High School
 Mutiusinazita High School

 Chimanimani High School
 Rusitu mission High school
 Karirwi High School
Mutambara High School
Nhedziwa High School 
Biriiri High School 
St Charles Lwanga Seminary Secondary school 
Nyambeya Primary School 
Matendeudze Primary School 
Mutambara Central Primary School
Thananchu Primary School
Nyanyadzi High school

Mashonaland Central Province 

 Darwin High School
 Mavuradonha High School
 Chindunduma High 1
 Chindunduma High 2
 Lady Enereta High School
 Barwick School
 Howard High School
 Mazowe Boys High School
 Saint Alberts High School
 Saint Philips Magwenya High School

Mashonaland East Province

Goromonzi District

 Goromonzi High School
 Rusununguko Secondary School

Chishawasha

 Chinyika Primary and Secondary School
 St Dominic's Chishawasha
 Saint Ignatius College
 Saint Joseph's School
 Saint Peter Claver Secondary School

Wedza District and Chikomba District 

 Kwenda Mission – boarding school
 Mt St Mary's Mission School – Wedza District
 Waddilove High School – Marondera, Marondera District

Marondera District

Mashonaland West Province

Chinhoyi

 Chinhoyi High School
 Lomagundi College
 Nemakonde High School

Kadoma 

 Jameson High School

Sanyati Baptist High School

Mhondoro 

 Moleli High School
 Sandringham High School
 New Hope Christian College
 St Michaels High school

Zvimba District 

 Kutama College
 Moleli High School
 Zowa High School
 Baramasimbe Primary School

Masvingo Province 

 Muzondo High School
 Dewure High School
 Rafomoyo Secondary School
 Rufaro High School
 Kurai Primary School
 Mutanda Primary School
 Gokomere High School
 Victoria High School
 Kyle College

Matabeleland North Province 

 Dampa Secondary School Cross-Dete
 Dandanda Primary School – Lupane
 Gloag High School – Turk Mine
 Gogo High School – Dandanda, Lupane
 Hlangabeza High School – Nkayi
 Inyathi High School – Inyati
 Nechibondo Primary School – Hwange
 Nemane Adventist High School – Tsholotsho
 Nkayi Secondary School – Nkayi
 Regina Mundi Secondary School – Lupane
 St George's Primary School – Hwange
 St. James High School
 Tshabanda Adventist High School – Tsholotsho
 Tsholotsho High School – Tsholotsho
 Victoria Falls Primary School – Victoria Falls

Matabeleland South Province 

 JZ Moyo High School – near West Nicholson
 Manama High School – Gwanda District; boarding school
 Mzingwane High School – Esigodini
 Singwango Secondary School – Filabusi, Insiza District
 Gwanda Government Secondary School – Gwanda central
 Thekwane High School – Bulilima District, Boarding school
 Solusi Adventist High School – near Solusi University, Boarding school
 Solusi Adventist Primary School – at Solusi University

Midlands Province

Gweru District

Secondary schools

 Ascot High School
 Bayayi Secondary School
 Cecil John Rhodes School
 Chaplin High School – Gweru
 Chegato High School
 Chegute High School
 Chovuragu Secondary School
 Fletcher High School – Gweru
 Guinea Fowl High School
 Gweru Polytechnic Institute – near Gweru
 Lower Gwelo Adventist High School
 Hwata Secondary school
 Lingfield Christian Academy
 Maringambizi Secondary School
 Matabo Secondary School
 Mataruse Secondary School
 Mavorovondo Secondary school *Guruva high School
 Matinunura High School
 Midlands Christian College – Gweru
 Mkoba 1 Secondary School
 Mkoba 3 Secondary School
 Mnene High School
 Mposi Secondary School
 Murerezi Secondary School
 Musume Secondary School
 Nashville Secondary School – near Gweru
 Nkululeko Secondary School
 Ntabamhlope Secondary School
 Regina Mundi High School
 Riverside School
 St. Patrick's Secondary School
 Sibomvu Secondary School
 Svita Secondary School
 Thornhill High School – Gweru
 Vubwe Secondary School
 Vungu Secondary School
 Vurasha Secondary School
 Vutata Secondary School
 Vutika Secondary School
 Vutsanana Secondary School
 Zvomukonde Secondary School

Chirumhanzu District

 ACEBS College

Kwekwe District 

 Goldridge Primary School
 Goldridge College
 Kwekwe High School 
 Manunure High School
 Mbizo High School
 Kenville High School

Shurugwi District 

 Tongogara High School

Silobela 

 Bee Mine Primary School
 Bhamala Primary School
 St Faith Primary School
 Samambwa Primary School
 Sidakeni Primary School
 Totororo Primary School
 Bee Mine Secondary School 
 Nyaradzo Secondary School
 Rio Tinto Zhombe High School
 Samambwa Secondary School
 Sidakeni Secondary School
 Totororo Secondary School

See also 

 Association of Trust Schools
 Education in Zimbabwe

References 

Schools
Schools
Zimbabwe
Zimbabwe

Schools